Roger Johnson Smyth (1815 – 19 September 1853) was an Irish Conservative and Peelite politician.

Smyth became Peelite MP for Lisburn at a by-election in December 1852—caused by the resignation of James Emerson Tennent—but died less than a year later in 1853.

References

External links
 

1815 births
1853 deaths
Irish Conservative Party MPs
Members of the Parliament of the United Kingdom for County Antrim constituencies (1801–1922)
UK MPs 1852–1857